Abd al-Salam Ibn Raghbân al-Kalbi al-Himsî ( (777–849), known as Dik al-Jinn, is an Arabic poet during the Abbasid Caliphate, who is famous for his love for a Christian woman named "Ward", and the fact that he never left his native city, Homs. He was a Shia Muslim.

Biography
Abd al-Salam was born in 777 CE in Homs, to a family descended from Banu Kalb.

Two theories are presented in order to explain his nickname "Dik al-Jinn" (Cock of al-Jinn):
 He would have been nicknamed so, because of his eyes whose green color evoked the plumage of the cock.
 For the funeral elegy poem (Rithā') which he composed for a cock served to him during a banquet.

Although the classic Arab criticism did not pay much attention to him, Dik al-Jinn remained famous for his debauchery and his love of wine that drove him to squander his fortune, and especially for the love he brought to "Ward", a Christian (later convert to Islam) from Homs; and "Bakr", a friend (probably another lover). Dik al-Jinn murdered both Ward and Bakr in a crisis of passionate love.

It seems that Dik al-Jinn inherited a large sum of money from his father, and that he would have lived on this nest egg, squandering it for his pleasures. He thus aroused the jealousy and disapproval of his cousin, "Abu Tayyib", who then made Dik al-Jinn believe that Ward and Bakr were dating one another. Being mad and jealous, Dik al-Jinn killed them both. Later on, he learned the truth and cried the rest of his life in funeral elegies that some critics, such as "Ibn Rashiq" recognize as models of their kind.

He is considered one of the masters of the poet Abu Tammam.

Poetry style
Dik al-Jinn departs, like his contemporary Abu Nuwas, standards of ancient poetry from Pre-Islamic qasida and its range of Bedouin themes. Leaving aside the long verses generally preferred by poets of the classical style, such as Tawil, Dik al-Jinn composed above all on the basit, kamil, and khafif meters. His diwan consists mainly of fragments and short pieces of amorous poetry (ghazal) and elegies addressed to "Ward". Another great part of his poetry is devoted to the love of wine. He also left some long pieces of praise (madîh) and a famous satire (hijâ') addressed to his cousin "Abu Tayyib".

His diwan has been collected by Sheikh Muhammad al-Samâwî, who was the first to gather his works.

References

777 births
849 deaths
People from Homs
Shia Muslims
8th-century Arabic poets
8th-century Arabic writers
Folklore characters
Poets from the Abbasid Caliphate
9th-century Arabic poets
8th-century Arabs
9th-century Arabs